Dark magic is the use of supernatural powers for selfish purposes.

Dark magic may also refer to:

Dark Magic (film), a 1939 short comedy film
Dark Magic (novel) by Christine Feehan (2000)
Dark Magick, a novel by Cate Tiernan (2001)

See also
Black Magic (disambiguation)
Dark arts (disambiguation)